Mark Madsen may refer to:

Mark Madsen (basketball) (born 1976), American basketball player and coach
Mark Madsen (fighter) (born 1984), Danish mixed martial artist and wrestler
Mark B. Madsen (born 1963), American politician and attorney from Utah